Hawk Eyes is an album by saxophonist Coleman Hawkins which was recorded in 1959 and released on the Prestige label.

Reception

Allmusic awarded the album 4 stars stating "in addition to long jams, plenty of fireworks occur during this frequently exciting session".

Track listing 
All compositions by Coleman Hawkins except as indicated
 "Hawk Eyes" - 10:19     
 "C'mon In" - 13:17     
 "Through for the Night" (Trummy Young) - 5:12     
 "I Never Knew" (Ted Fio Rito, Gus Kahn) - 5:42     
 "La Rosita" (Paul Dupont, Allan Stuart) - 6:09     
 Stealin' the Bean""  (Osie Johnson) - 4:31

Personnel 
Coleman Hawkins - tenor saxophone
Charlie Shavers - trumpet (tracks 1-4 & 6)
Ray Bryant - piano
Tiny Grimes - guitar (tracks 1-4 & 6)
George Duvivier - bass
Osie Johnson - drums

References 

Coleman Hawkins albums
1959 albums
Prestige Records albums
Albums recorded at Van Gelder Studio
Albums produced by Bob Weinstock